Prin Suparat (born 19 March 1990), known internationally as Mark Prin, is a Thai actor and model. He is seen on Channel 3. He is a member of the group called 4+1 Channel 3 Superstar with Mario Maurer, Nadech Kugimiya, Pakorn Chatborirak, and Phupoom Pongpanu. He is also well known for his roles in Punya Chon Kon Krua (2012), Pope Rak (2014), Rak Nakara (2017), Kleun Cheewit (2017), My Husband in Law (2020), and My Forever Sunshine (2020).

Personal life 

Suparat was born in Chiang Mai to Thai Chinese parents.  He grew up in Lampang. His entrance and debut break into the Entertainment/Acting field begun after he was scouted by a manager working for Channel 3.

He attended the Faculty of Tourism and Hospitality at Rangsit University on an athletic scholarship. His talent is Judo black belt (middleweight) and is on the Judo team for Rangsit University.

On April 21, 2022, Mark Prin and his girlfriend of eight years, Kimberley Anne Woltemas, got engaged.

Filmography

Films

Television dramas

Music video appearances

Endorsements

Campaign 

2011
Net Design
Tipco Orange Juice
Tipco 100% with Ploy Chermarn Boonyasak
 Honda Brio
Yah See Fun
XACT Autume/Winter 2011 Collection

2012
Oishi 2012 (Tour Japan)
I-Mobile Sport Lifestyle
Tipco Fruit Plus
Honda Brio with Urassaya Sperbund
I-Mobile I-Style Q2'Fitne Tea with Toey Jarinporn

2013Vaseline for MenDoubelMint Bubble Gum12Plus Colorista with Kim Tae Hee2014CloseUp with Kimberly Ann Voltemas

2017Samsung Galaxy J7 with Peechaya Wattanamontree

2020Family Mart with Kimberly Ann Voltemas

2021The North Face Gucci'' with Davika Hoorne

Discography

Song 
 Rak Hai Roo(Love to Know) Ost. Sarm Noon Nuer Tong
  Yoot Wela (Stop Time) Ost. Phope Ruk

MC 
 Online 
 2021 : Full EP.1 | Bookmark On Air YouTube:Landmark

Awards

References

External links 
Prin Suparat's Official Instagram

1990 births
Living people
Prin Suparat
Prin Suparat
Prin Suparat
Prin Suparat
Prin Suparat
Thai television personalities
Prin Suparat